Eli Capilouto (born August 22, 1949, in Montgomery, Alabama)  is the twelfth president of the University of Kentucky. He previously had been the provost of the University of Alabama at Birmingham (UAB).

Early life
Capilouto is a native of Alabama, and is Jewish. He received most of his education in Alabama, and has spent much of his career within the state. Capilouto obtained his bachelor's degree from the University of Alabama (Tuscaloosa). His Doctor of Dental Medicine and master's degrees in epidemiology came from UAB. He joined the UAB faculty in 1975. In 1991, he received a doctorate in health policy and management from Harvard School of Public Health. He is married to Mary Lynne Capilouto, who is also a dentist and former dean of the School of Dentistry at UAB. The couple has one daughter.

Academic and administrative career
Capilouto served as Dean of the UAB School of Public Health from 1994 to 2001 before he returned to his research and faculty appointment as professor. He was named Acting Provost in 2002, and assumed the post permanently in 2005. On May 4, 2011, Capilouto was selected to succeed Lee Todd, Jr., the eleventh president of the University of Kentucky. He was hired under a five-year contract with a base annual salary of $500,000 plus $125,000 in benefits and a possible bonus of up to $50,000. In a letter to the Board of Trustees, Capilouto proposed giving 10 percent of his salary for the 2020-21 academic year to the employee assistance fund set up by UK's Department of Human Resources. The fund was established to help the 1,700 UK employees furloughed during the coronavirus pandemic.

Under his administration, the University of Kentucky sued the university's student newspaper to appeal an open records dispute with the Kentucky Attorney General regarding a sexual harassment case involving students and a faculty member. The judge upheld the appeal, stating that the student records in the case are protected under the Federal Family Educational Rights and Privacy Act (FERPA). The newspaper plans to appeal the decision. The situation has created substantial controversy.

Controversy
Although his 2018 salary and compensation totaled over $1,500,000, Capilouto refused to take a pay cut despite the University of Kentucky furloughing 1500 healthcare workers during the COVID-19 pandemic.

References

External links
 President's page at uky.edu

Living people
1949 births
Presidents of the University of Kentucky
People from Montgomery, Alabama
University of Alabama at Birmingham faculty
American dentistry academics
Harvard School of Public Health alumni
University of Alabama alumni
Jewish American academics
Jews and Judaism in Alabama